Jan Beneš (born 24 October 1982) is a Czech footballer who plays as a right-back.

Career

Beneš spent six years with Hallescher FC, whom he joined in 2007, when they were in the NOFV-Oberliga, and helped them earn promotion to the Regionalliga Nord in 2008, and the 3. Liga in 2012. He played in the club's first game at this level, a 1–0 win over Kickers Offenbach. He was released by Halle at the end of the 2012–13 season and signed for Wacker Nordhausen.

References

External links

1982 births
Living people
Czech footballers
Hallescher FC players
People from Varnsdorf
Czech expatriate footballers
Expatriate footballers in Germany
3. Liga players
Association football defenders
Sportspeople from the Ústí nad Labem Region